The 2010 NCAA Division I Men's Golf Championship was a golf tournament contested from June 1–6, 2010 at the Honors Course in Ooltewah, Tennessee. It was the 72nd NCAA Division I Men's Golf Championship. The team championship was won by the Augusta State Jaguars, their first, who defeated the Oklahoma State Cowboys in the championship match play round 3 to 2. The individual national championship was won by Scott Langley from the University of Illinois.

Venue

This was the second NCAA Division I Men's Golf Championship held at the Honors Course in Ooltewah, Tennessee just to the north of Chattanooga; the course previously hosted in 1996.

Team competition

Leaderboard
Par, single-round: 288
Par, total: 864
The top eight teams advanced to the match play portion of the tournament.

Stanford (−3) won the eighth place playoff tie-breaker with San Diego (−2) and Arizona State (−1).
Rest of the Field: Florida (869), Virginia (869), Texas A&M (871), North Florida (872), USC (874), Clemson (875), Oregon State (875), UCLA (875), Illinois (876), Kent State (877), UNLV (879), Texas (879), California (880), LSU (883), Baylor (884), Tennessee (884), Duke (889), TCU (889), Penn State (898), Georgia Southern (905)

Match play bracket

Championship match play

References

NCAA Men's Golf Championship
Golf in Tennessee
NCAA Division I Men's Golf Championship
NCAA Division I Men's Golf Championship
NCAA Division I Men's Golf Championship
NCAA Division I Men's Golf Championship